Milevska planina is a mountain in western Bulgaria and southeastern Serbia, near the town of Bosilegrad. Its highest peak Milevets (also transcribed as Milevetz or Milevec) or Krvavi kamik has an elevation of 1,738 meters above sea level. It is located at the border of Bulgaria and Serbia.

References

Mountains of Bulgaria
Mountains of Serbia
Landforms of Kyustendil Province
Rhodope mountain range